Malliner See is a lake in the Mecklenburgische Seenplatte district in Mecklenburg-Vorpommern, Germany. At an elevation of 39.6 m, its surface area is 0.731 km².

Lakes of Mecklenburg-Western Pomerania